Colne Valley is an unparished area in the metropolitan borough of Kirklees, West Yorkshire, England.  Colne Valley ward contains over 480 listed buildings that are recorded in the National Heritage List for England.  Of these, twelve are listed at Grade II*, the middle of the three grades, and the others are at Grade II, the lowest grade.

This list contains the listed buildings in the western part of the ward, in which the biggest settlement is the large village of Marsden, and it includes the smaller settlements and districts of Bradshaw, Lingards Wood, Scammonden, and Wilberlee.  Apart from Marsden, this part of the ward is almost completely rural, consisting of countryside and moorland.  A high proportion of the listed buildings are farmhouses and farm buildings, almost all constructed in stone with roofs of stone slate, and containing mullioned windows.  During the 19th century, the ward was involved in the textile industry, and the listed buildings associated with this are former weavers' houses and mills.  The River Colne and the Huddersfield Narrow Canal pass through this part of the ward, and the listed buildings associated with these include bridges, canal milestones, former keepers' cottages, and a former warehouse.  In the western part of the ward are the entrances to the Standedge Tunnels which carry the canal and the railway under the Pennines, and the portals leading to these are listed.  The other listed buildings include houses and cottages and associated structures, churches and chapels and associated structures, guide posts and milestones, bridges, including three packhorse bridges, a set of water troughs, a former engine house serving the canal tunnel, a pinfold, a set of tenter posts, public houses, structures associated with Butterley Reservoir, a former mechanics' institute, an aqueduct and weir, and three memorials, two of them war memorials.

The listed buildings in the other parts of the ward can be found at Listed buildings in Colne Valley (central area) and Listed buildings in Colne Valley (eastern area)



Key

Buildings

References

Citations

Sources

Lists of listed buildings in West Yorkshire
Listed